The Kent History and Library Centre is a purpose-built headquarters in James Whatman Way, Maidstone, that opened on 23 April 2012. It has been designed to incorporate under one roof the former Centre for Kentish Studies (the combined county record office and local studies library) and the town's former Central Library.

Sculpture
In August 2013 a sculpture by Antony Gormley entitled "Two Stones" was installed adjacent to the building. The sculpture had originally been commissioned by Kent County Council in the 1970s from Gormley, then a newly graduated art student of the Maidstone College of Art, for a new development in Ashford but had been removed following vandalism.

References

External links

Kent Archives and Local History web page

Archives in Kent
Kent
Libraries in Kent
Buildings and structures in Maidstone